Todd Sieben (born July 11, 1945) was a Republican member of the Illinois Senate who represented northwestern Illinois from 1993 until his resignation in March 2008.

Sieben was born in Geneseo, Illinois on July 11, 1945. He attended Western Illinois University where he earned a bachelor's degree in business administration. From 1968 to 1972 he served as an officer in the United States Navy including serving in Vietnam. He ended his service with the United States Navy in 1972 with the rank of Lieutenant. He then became co-owner and vice-president of Sieben Hybrids, a family seed business and he operated a 400-acre livestock farm.

In 1986, he was elected to the Illinois House of Representatives to succeed A. T. McMaster. During his time in the House he praised lifting the inheritance tax, attempted to shorten campaigning season by moving back Illinois's March primary elections and was supportive of education reform with the exception of forced school district consolidation. In 1991, he advocated for Northern Illinois University to convert the Campbell Center in Mount Carroll, Illinois into a regional branch, similar to ones in Hoffman Estates and Naperville.

In 1992, he was elected to the Illinois Senate to represent the 37th district to succeed Calvin W. Schuneman.

After the 2001 redistricting, Sieben's district was renumbered to the 45th and drawn to include all of Jo Daviess, Stephenson and Lee counties and portions of Winnebago, Ogle, Carroll, Whiteside and Henry counties. In 2003, he was appointed an Assistant Republican Leader.

He ran unopposed in 1998, 2002 and 2006. In 2007, he announced his retirement, but in February 2008 he chose to resign to become a lobbyist for the ethanol industry. He was succeeded by retired Lee County Sherriff Tim Bivins.

References

External links
Senator Todd Sieben official website 
Senator Todd Sieben official GOP website 
Illinois General Assembly - Senator Todd Sieben (R) 45th District
Bills, Committees
Illinois State Senate Republicans - Todd Sieben profile, senategop.state.il.us; accessed January 16, 2017.

1945 births
Living people
People from Geneseo, Illinois
Western Illinois University alumni
Businesspeople from Illinois
Republican Party Illinois state senators
Republican Party members of the Illinois House of Representatives
21st-century American politicians
Military personnel from Illinois